Gabriel Eugen David (born 11 February 2003) is a Romanian professional footballer who plays as a midfielder for Liga I side FC Botoșani.

References

External links
 

2003 births
Living people
Sportspeople from Botoșani
Romanian footballers
Association football midfielders
Liga I players
Liga III players
FC Botoșani players
21st-century Romanian people